Statistics of Emperor's Cup in the 1978 season.

Overview
It was contested by 28 teams, and Mitsubishi Motors won the championship.

Results

1st round
Yanmar Club 4–1 Mazda Auto Hiroshima
Fujitsu 4–0 Kyushu Sangyo University
Osaka Sangyo University 0–4 Nippon Kokan
Yanmar Diesel 6–0 Osaka University of Economics
Fukuoka University 0–4 Nissei Resin Industry
Tanabe Pharmaceuticals 2–1 Teijin
Gonohe Town Hall 1–5 Hosei University
Honda 2–1 Kokushikan University
Sumitomo Metals 0–1 Furukawa Electric
Nippon Steel 1–3 Sapporo University
Saitama Teachers 1–3 Yomiuri
Toyota Motors 0–1 Waseda University

2nd round
Fujita Industries 5–1 Yanmar Club
Fujitsu 1–0 Nippon Kokan
Yanmar Diesel 7–1 Nissei Resin Industry
Tanabe Pharmaceuticals 2–3 Toyo Industries
Hitachi 2–1 Hosei University
Honda 0–3 Furukawa Electric
Sapporo University 2–0 Yomiuri
Waseda University 1–3 Mitsubishi Motors

Quarterfinals
Fujita Industries 3–0 Fujitsu
Yanmar Diesel 2–2 (PK 2–4) Toyo Industries
Hitachi 1–1 (PK 3–5) Furukawa Electric
Sapporo University 0–5 Mitsubishi Motors

Semifinals
Fujita Industries 0–3 Toyo Industries
Furukawa Electric 0–1 Mitsubishi Motors

Final

Toyo Industries 0–1 Mitsubishi Motors
Mitsubishi Motors won the championship.

References
 NHK

Emperor's Cup
Emperor's Cup
1979 in Japanese football